Hiiumaa Parish (Estonian: Hiiumaa vald) is a rural municipality of Estonia on the island of Hiiumaa. Hiiumaa Parish was established by merging Emmaste Parish, Hiiu Parish, Käina Parish and Pühalepa Parish after the municipal elections held on 15 October 2017. Kärdla is the administrative center of the municipality. The current mayor (vallavanem) is Hergo Tasuja. The municipalities of Emmaste and Pühalepa contested their forced merger with Hiiu and Käina to form the new Hiiumaa municipality, which includes the whole island and what is Hiiu County.

Settlements 
There is one town, Kärdla, two small boroughs (alevik): Käina and Kõrgessaare, and 182 villages in Hiiumaa Parish:

  Aadma
  Ala
  Allika
  Aruküla
  Emmaste
  Emmaste-Kurisu
  Emmaste-Selja
  Esiküla
  Hagaste
  Haldi
  Haldreka
  Harju
  Hausma
  Heigi
  Heiste
  Heistesoo
  Hellamaa
  Heltermaa
  Hiiessaare
  Hilleste
  Hindu
  Hirmuste
  Härma
  Hüti
  Isabella
  Jausa
  Jõeküla
  Jõeranna
  Jõesuu
  Kaasiku
  Kabuna
  Kaderna
  Kaigutsi
  Kalana
  Kaleste
  Kalgi
  Kanapeeksi
  Kassari
  Kauste
  Kerema
  Kidaste
  Kiduspe
  Kiivera
  Kitsa
  Kleemu
  Kodeste
  Kogri
  Koidma
  Kolga
  Kopa
  Kukka
  Kuri
  Kuriste
  Kurisu
  Kuusiku
  Kõlunõmme
  Kõmmusselja
  Kõpu
  Kärdla-Nõmme
  Külaküla
  Külama
  Laartsa
  Laasi
  Lassi
  Laheküla
  Lauka
  Leerimetsa
  Lehtma
  Leigri
  Leisu
  Lelu
  Lepiku
  Ligema
  Lilbi
  Linnumäe
  Loja
  Luguse
  Luidja
  Lõbembe
  Lõpe
  Malvaste
  Mangu
  Mardihansu
  Meelste
  Metsaküla
  Metsalauka
  Metsapere
  Moka
  Muda
  Mudaste
  Mäeküla
  Mäeltse
  Mägipe
  Männamaa
  Mänspe
  Määvli
  Napi
  Nasva
  Niidiküla
  Nurste
  Nõmba
  Nõmme
  Nõmmerga
  Ogandi
  Ojaküla
  Ole
  Orjaku
  Otste
  Palade
  Palli
  Paluküla
  Paope
  Partsi
  Pihla
  Pilpaküla
  Poama
  Prassi
  Prähnu
  Prählamäe
  Puliste
  Puski
  Putkaste
  Pärna
  Pärnselja
  Pühalepa
  Pühalepa-Harju
  Rannaküla
  Reheselja
  Reigi
  Reigi-Nõmme
  Reikama
  Riidaküla
  Risti
  Ristivälja
  Rootsi
  Sakla
  Salinõmme
  Sarve
  Selja
  Sepaste
  Sigala
  Sinima
  Soonlepa
  Suuremõisa
  Suurepsi
  Suureranna
  Suuresadama
  Sõru
  Sääre
  Sülluste
  Taguküla
  Tahkuna
  Tammela
  Tammistu
  Tareste
  Taterma
  Tempa
  Tiharu
  Tilga
  Tohvri
  Tubala
  Tärkma
  Ulja
  Undama
  Utu
  Vaemla
  Vahtrepa
  Valgu
  Valipe
  Vanamõisa
  Viilupi
  Viiri
  Viita
  Viitasoo
  Vilima
  Vilivalla
  Villamaa
  Villemi
  Värssu
  Õngu
  Ühtri
  Ülendi

References

External links 
Official homepage (Estonian)

 
Municipalities of Estonia